The 1999 Taraba State gubernatorial election occurred on January 9, 1999. PDP candidate Jolly Nyame won the election, defeating APP candidate.

Results
Jolly Nyame from the PDP won the election. APP and AD candidates contested in the election.

The total number of registered voters in the state was 979,001, total votes cast was 839,379, valid votes was 816,117 and rejected votes was 23,262.

'''Jolly Nyame, (PDP)- 467,025

APP- 343,898

AD- 5,194

References 

Taraba State gubernatorial election
Taraba State gubernatorial election

Taraba State gubernatorial elections